Nogometni klub Izola, commonly referred to as NK Izola or simply Izola, was a Slovenian football club from Izola. They played in the Slovenian top division for five consecutive seasons during the early 1990s. The club was dissolved after the 1995–96 Slovenian PrvaLiga season.

History

The club was founded in 1923 as Club Calcistico Giovanile Isola d'Istria, when the city of Isola was part of Italy. It was known as Ampelea Isola d'Istria between 1930 and 1946, and played in Serie C between 1937 and 1946. Italian internationals Giuseppe Grezar, Alberto Eliani and Aredio Gimona played with Ampelea in the 1943–44 season. Due to the occupation of Istria and the Trieste territory by the Yugoslav Army, it was forced to change its name to the more proletarian sounding Unione Sportiva Isola, and finally to NK Izola in 1951.

The club was dissolved after the 1995–96 Slovenian PrvaLiga season due to financial problems. A successor club was established in 1996 under the name MNK Izola.

Honours
Slovenian Republic League
 Winners: 1989–90

European football
Izola played in the 1992–93 UEFA Cup, losing to Benfica.

References

Association football clubs established in 1923
Association football clubs disestablished in 1996
1923 establishments in Italy
Defunct football clubs in Slovenia
Former Italian football clubs
Serie C clubs